José Luis López Vázquez de la Torre MML (11 March 1922, in Madrid – 2 November 2009, in Madrid) was a Spanish actor.

Career
José Luis López Vázquez was born in Madrid, Spain, on 11 March 1922. He originally worked in theater as a costume designer, a scenic designer, and as an assistant director to Pío Ballesteros and Enrique Herreros. In 1946, he switched over to film, with a small role in the movie María Fernanda la Jerezana. Originally starring in comic roles, he made the move to drama films in the 1960s, demonstrating his profound aptitude for acting.

During his life, he starred in more than 200 movies, filming several full-length films in a year. In 1971, he acted in 11 films. Although he usually appeared in Spanish films, he occasionally worked on international projects, such as the 1972 UK film Travels With My Aunt, in which he starred opposite Dame Maggie Smith. Also in 1972, he starred in the Emmy-winning film, La Cabina, directed by Antonio Mercero. López Vázquez worked with Mercero on numerous other occasions, the last being their collaboration on a movie called ¿Y tú quién eres? (2006).

López Vázquez died of natural causes in Madrid on 2 November 2009, at the age of 87.

Filmography
 The Devil Plays the Flute (1953)
 An Andalusian Gentleman (1954)
 Night and Dawn (1958)
 Andalusia Express (1956)
 Back to the Door (1959)
 El pisito, (1959)
 El cochecito, (1960)
 Carnival Day (1960)
 Police Calling 091 (1960)
 Plácido, (1961)
 Atraco a las tres, (1962)
 La gran familia, (1962)
 You and Me Are Three (1962)
 The Daughters of Helena (1963)
 Three Sparrows and a Bit (1964)
 Television Stories (1965)
 He's My Man! (1966)
Forty Degrees in the Shade (1967)
 Love in Flight (1967)
 Amor a la española, (1967)
 Peppermint frappé, (1967)
 Sor Citroën, (1967)
 Operation Mata Hari (1968)
 El bosque del lobo, (1970)
 Long Live the Bride and Groom (1970)
 Mi querida señorita, (1971)
 Travels with my aunt, (1972)
 No es bueno que el hombre esté solo (1973) as Martín
 La descarriada (1973) as Florencio
 La prima Angélica, (1974)
 The Marriage Revolution (1974)
 Habla, mudita (1973)
 La escopeta nacional, (1977)
 National Heritage, (1981)
 Hay que deshacer la casa (1983)
 Akelarre, (1984)
 Todos a la cárcel, (1993)

Awards
Goya Awards
2004 – Honorary Award for lifetime achievements

Gold Medal of Arts
1985 – Gold Medal of Arts (Medalla de Oro de las Bellas Artes).

International Emmy Awards
1973 – Fiction for La Cabina

1972 Chicago Film Festival
1972 – Best Actor Award for Mi querida señorita

1971 Chicago Film Festival
1971 – Best Actor Award for El bosque del lobo

Honours 
 Gold Medal of Merit in Labour (Kingdom of Spain, 19 December 1997).

External links

References

1922 births
2009 deaths
Emmy Award winners
Male actors from Madrid
Spanish male film actors
Honorary Goya Award winners
20th-century Spanish male actors